The Polar Urals are a mountain range in the western part of the Yamalo-Nenets Autonomous Okrug and the northeastern part of Komi, Russian Federation. The border between Europe and Asia runs along the main ridge of the Polar Urals. The Salekhard–Igarka Railway stretch of the Northern Railway runs along the valley of the Sob in the mountains.

Geography
The Polar Urals are a subrange of the Urals. They stretch roughly from SW to NE for  forming the northern section of the long Ural chain. 
The range runs from the area of the sources of the Khulga river of the Ob basin in the south, to the Konstantinov Kamen mountain rising above Baydaratskaya Bay of the Kara Sea at the northern end.

The mountains display traces of massive ancient glaciation in U-shaped valleys, cirques and moraines. Some small glaciers remain, such as the Geographical Institute Glacier and the Dolgushin Glacier. The Usa, a tributary of the Pechora with its tributaries Elets, Kechpel, among others, the Kara, as well as numerous left tributaries of the Ob such as the Synya, Voykar, Sob, Longot-Yugan and Shchuchya, have their sources in the range. There are many lakes in the mountain area, the largest and deepest of which are Khadata-Yugan-Lor (Хадатаёганлор) and the Shchuchye (pike) lakes.

Flora
On the slopes of the higher elevations and in the northern parts there is mountain tundra with moss and lichen as well as vast rocky and stony desolate areas.

See also
List of mountains and hills of Russia

References

External links

Mountain ranges of Russia
Mountains of the Komi Republic
Landforms of Yamalo-Nenets Autonomous Okrug
Ural Mountains